The 110t class were a class of twelve coastal torpedo boats built for the Austro-Hungarian Navy between 1909 and 1911. They were built by two shipbuilders, the Austrian Stabilimento Tecnico Triestino and the Hungarian Ganz & Danubius, with six ships built each. They served through the First World War, with one of the ships, Tb 11, defecting to Italy in 1917. After the end of the war, several of the class were used by the Italian Navy and the Italian Customs Service, with the last example scrapped in 1926.

Design
In 1905, the Austrian Naval Technical Committee proposed three designs for a 110 t coastal torpedo boat, differing in the machinery used, with steam turbines or vertical triple expansion engines to be used. By 1907, these had been refined to a single design, oil-fuelled but powered by a triple expansion engine as the designers had insufficient experience with turbines. This local design was compared with designs from the German shipyards Schichau-Werke and Krupp and the British shipyard Yarrow and was considered to be superior to the foreign designs.

It was initially planned for Stabilimento Tecnico Triestino (STT) to build eight ships at their Trieste shipyard, but it was required for political reasons that the work be divided between Austrian and Hungarian shipyards, and in the end six ships were built each at the Austrian STT shipyard and the Hungarian Ganz & Danubius yard at Fiume, with each shipbuilder building slightly different designs, with the Ganz & Danubius-built ships having different machinery in order to increase the Hungarian content in the ships.

Armament of all ships was two Škoda  L/44 guns and two  torpedo tubes. The ships had a crew of 20.

Service
Construction of the ships began in April 1909, with deliveries starting at the end of that year, and continuing until May 1911. While in general the class proved adequately seaworthy, the inexperience of the Danubis shipyard resulted in their torpedo boats having a tendency to heel at high speeds owing to the torque of the single propeller. In 1910, Austria-Hungary's older coastal torpedo boats were redesignated, replacing their names with a number, and the 110t-class were renumbered, with their Roman numeral being replaced by an Arabic number.

Duties included minesweeping, escort and anti-submarine operations.

On the night of 30/31 July 1916, the  ran aground at Galiola Island in the Kvarner Gulf. Tb 4, Tb 6 and the Torpedo gunboat  helped to capture the submarine, which sank under tow the next day. In March 1917, five ships of the class (Tb 1, Tb 3, Tb 6, Tb 7 and Tb 9 were based at Pola, with two (Tb 2 and Tb 4) at Lussin and four (Tb 8, Tb 10, Tb 11 and Tb 12) at Šibenik.

On 5 October 1917, the crew of Tb 11 mutinied, locking the ship's officers in their cabin and taking the ship from Šibenik to the Italian coast, where they surrendered the ship. Tb 11 was incorporated in the Italian Navy as the Francesco Rismondo. On 16 November, Tb 6 and Tb 9 were part of an escort of 14 torpedo boats for Budapest and Wien when the two battleships bombarded shore batteries at Cortellazzo. On 26 August 1918, six ships (Tb 1, Tb 2, Tb 3, Tb 5, Tb 6 and Tb 9) were based at Pola, while four more (Tb 8, Tb 10, Tb 12 and Tb 14) were based at Šibenik and one (Tb 4 at Trieste).

The ships were allocated to the Allies under the Treaty of Saint-Germain-en-Laye after the end of the war. Four ships (Tb 6, Tb 8, Tb 9 and Tb 10) were allocated to Great Britain, but were sold for scrap and broken up in 1920, while the remaining ships were allocated to Italy. Tb 1, Tb 2, Tb 4 and Tb 5 were scrapped in 1920, while Tb 12 was scrapped in 1922. Tb 3 and Tb 7 were operated by the Italian Customs Service, serving until 1925 and 1926 respectively, while Francesco Rismondo remained in service with the Italian Navy until 1925.

Ships

Notes

Citations

References
 
 
 
 

Torpedo boats of the Austro-Hungarian Navy
World War I torpedo boats of Austria-Hungary